Mangla Airport  is situated 10 km (6.2 mi) from the city centre of Mangla Cantt, 3 km from Dina, Pakistan and approximately 20 km from the famous city Mirpur, Azad Jammu Kashmir. It is not being used by any commercial airline. It's current designation is only for military purposes.The strategic location of the airport is somewhat debatable as it is very close to the illegally Bharat occupied part of Jammu Kashmir.The airport has great potential for civilian use. It would be relatively cheap to extend the runway. The new location of the Islamabad airport is even worse for the people of Jhelum and Gujarat as well as the residents of Mirpur Division. North Punjab is a huge area and very densely populated. The current three international airports( Islamabad,Lahore,Sialkot )are completely inadequate for this areas population as the bulk of the Pakistani origin population now living abroad,especially those in the United Kingdom do not originate from the vicinity of the three civilian airports mentioned. The area would receive a massive boost from increased international tourism and this can only be good for Pakistan's economy.The example of Turkey and other countries needs to be followed in creating more airports to cut down on travel time for holiday makers.

See also
 List of airports in Pakistan
 Transport in Pakistan
 Pakistan Civil Aviation Authority
 Mangla
 Jhelum Cantonment

Airports in Jhelum
Pakistan Army airbases